Rishi is a given name. Notable people with this name include:

 Rishi Bachan (born 1986), West Indies cricketer
 Rishi Bhat (born 1986), American child actor and internet entrepreneur
 Rishi Devkota (died 1981), Nepalese communist leader
 Danko Jones (Rishi James Ganjoo), Canadian rock musician, singer and composer
 Rishi Kapoor (1952–2020), Indian Bollywood actor, film producer and director
 Rishi Kumaar (1975–2018), Singaporean actor, musician, lyricist
 Rishi Prakash Tyagi, senior police officer in India
 Rishi Ram (born 1952), Fijian civil servant and former diplomat of Indian descent
 Rishi Reddi, American author
 Rishi Rich or Rishpal Singh, British Asian music producer
 Rishi Shah (born 1986), American billionaire, founder of Outcome Health
 Rishi Shankar (1934–2015), Fiji Indian lawyer
 Rishi Sunak (born 1980), British politician, Prime Minister of the United Kingdom

See also

 Rishi (surname)
 Rishi (disambiguation)